Big Haynes Creek is a stream in the U.S. state of Georgia. It is a tributary to the Yellow River.

Big Haynes Creek was named after Thomas Haynes, proprietor of a local gin.

References

Rivers of Georgia (U.S. state)
Rivers of Gwinnett County, Georgia
Rivers of Newton County, Georgia
Rivers of Rockdale County, Georgia